Pistros (Greek: Πίστρος) is an islet between Ithaca and mainland Greece, one of the Ionian Islands. , it had no resident population.

References

External links
Pistros on GTP Travel Pages (in English and Greek)

Echinades
Islands of the Ionian Islands (region)
Islands of Greece
Landforms of Cephalonia